Milligan District (also, Slabtown and Hoodsville) is a former settlement in Amador County, California. It lay at an elevation of 1601 feet (488 m).

References

Former settlements in Amador County, California
Former populated places in California